Marikina–Pasig station (also known as Marikina station) is an elevated Manila Light Rail Transit (LRT) station situated on Line 2. It is located in Barangay San Roque, Marikina City, near the tripoint boundary of Pasig City, Metro Manila and Cainta, Rizal, Philippines. The station is located on the stretch of Marikina–Infanta Highway near the intersection of Gil Fernando Avenue–Felix Avenue and is named after the cities of Marikina and Pasig which the station straddles between.

Marikina–Pasig station serves as the twelfth station for trains headed to Antipolo and the second station for trains headed to Recto. This is the line's last station in Metro Manila from Recto station before heading to the line's eastern terminus at Antipolo.

History
Marikina–Pasig station was constructed as part of the Line 2 East Extension, which calls for a  extension eastward from Santolan station and the construction of two stations. The station during its inception was called "Emerald", but was renamed as "Marikina" in January 2021 prior to its opening. It was renamed a second time on October 31, 2021, as "Marikina–Pasig".

Construction of the East Extension began in 2015, while the Antipolo and Marikina–Pasig station broke ground in May 2017. The opening of the extension was supposed to be in the fourth quarter of 2020, but was postponed repeatedly due to the COVID-19 pandemic and various circumstances in integrating the east extension to the line's existing systems.

The east extension was inaugurated on July 1, 2021, and Marikina–Pasig station opened to the public on July 5, 2021. Rides for the East Extension were free of charge until July 18, 2021. When the station opened, the westbound platform was only operational for temporary bidirectional shuttle services since the integration works of the east extension to the line's existing systems was not completed. The eastbound platform became operable on September 3, 2021, after integration works were completed.

Nearby landmarks
The station is directly connected to two shopping centers: Sta. Lucia East Grand Mall and Robinsons Metro East. It is also easily accessible to the residential areas of Barangay San Roque in Marikina via Liamzon, Ditchoy, Dasdasan, Beta, Kapwa, and Sta. Lucia Residences.

The station also accessible via public transport stops along Marcos Highway for those commuters heading to Ayala Malls Feliz and APT Studios, and along Gil Fernando Avenue for those commuters heading to Marikina City Hall, Marikina Sports Complex, Blue Wave Mall, S&R Marikina, and residential condominiums such as Tropicana Garden City, Marquinton and Sienna Tower Residences, which lie some distance from the station. The station is one of the largest train stations built in Line 2 and it is expected as one of the line's busiest stations due to its location at the busiest thoroughfare along Marcos Highway.

Transportation links
There is a jeepney and UV Express terminal in Robinsons Metro East. There is also a jeepney terminal at Sta. Lucia Grand East Mall. The station also serves a bus stop in Sta. Lucia East Grand Mall via Bus Route 9 (Cubao–Antipolo) for direct trips going to and from Marikina, Pasig, Manila and Quezon City in Metro Manila and Cainta and Antipolo in Rizal. Taxis are available upon request.

Gallery

Notes

References

Manila Light Rail Transit System stations
Railway stations opened in 2021
Buildings and structures in Marikina